Angermeans is the third full-length album by the Californian hardcore band Strife. It was released in 2001 on Victory Records.

Critical reception
The Daily Herald called the album "vicious," writing that it "has as much Slayer as Agnostic Front in its lineage." AllMusic wrote that it "is not just a comeback for the band, it's a long-overdue kick in the butt for a whole [hardcore] movement as well."

Track listing

Personnel

Strife
 Rick Rodney – vocals and photography
 Chad Peterson – bass
 Sidney Niesen – drums
 Andrew Kline – guitar

Additional musicians
 Tom Ball – additional guitar (on "Angermeans" and "From The Graves")
 Ellie Wyatt – additional violin (on "Angel Wings)
 Eric Bobo – percussion (on "From These Graves)
 Melody Rodney – piano (on "Angel Wings)

Production
 Sean O'Dwyer – producing and engineering and mixing
 John Nelson – producing and engineering
 Rpgello Lozano – producing
 John Delaney – engineering
 Justina Powell – assistant engineering
 Josh Lynch – drum programming
 Nate Scott – art direction and design, photography

References

Strife (band) albums
2001 albums